Vatica lowii is a species of plant in the family Dipterocarpaceae.

Distribution
Vatica lowii is found in Sumatra and Peninsular Malaysia. It is an endangered species threatened by habitat loss.

References

lowii
Trees of Sumatra
Trees of Peninsular Malaysia
Endangered flora of Asia
Taxonomy articles created by Polbot